James Milton Burns was a professional baseball outfielder. He played in the minor leagues through 1896. He was 5’7 and weighed 168 lbs. at the time of his death.

External links

1909 deaths
Major League Baseball outfielders
Baseball players from St. Louis
Kansas City Cowboys players
Washington Statesmen players
19th-century baseball players
Omaha Omahogs players
Omaha Lambs players
Kansas City Blues (baseball) players
Denver Mountaineers players
Portland Webfeet players
Savannah Electrics players
Savannah Rabbits players
Minneapolis Minnies players
Detroit Creams players
Minneapolis Millers (baseball) players
Grand Rapids Gold Bugs players
St. Paul Apostles players
St. Paul Saints (AA) players
Year of birth missing